The University of Montenegro Faculty of Civil Engineering (Montenegrin: Građevinski fakultet Univerziteta Crne Gore Грађевински факултет Универзитета Црне Горе) is one of the educational institutions of the University of Montenegro. Its building is located in Podgorica, at the University campus.

History 

The Faculty grew out of the Faculty of Electrical Engineering. Due to the growing need for educated civil engineering workers in Montenegro, especially after the 1979 earthquake that struck the country, the Faculty of Civil Engineering was officially established on July 2nd, 1980, as part of the "Veljko Vlahović" University (today's University of Montenegro).

Organization

Undergraduate studies 

Undergraduate academic studies are organized at the Civil Engineering course of studies, while undergraduate applied studies are organized at the Management in Civil Engineering course.

Postgraduate specialist studies and master studies 

Postgraduate specialist and master studies are organized at the following courses of studies at the Faculty:
 Construction
 Hydro-technics
 Transport
 Engineering and Spatial Planning
 Construction Management and Technology

Doctoral studies 

Doctoral studies are organized at the following courses of studies:
 Constructions
 Hydro-technics
 Traffic and Spatial Planning Area
 Management in Civil Engineering

References 

Civil Engineering
Montenegro
Engineering universities and colleges in Montenegro
1980 establishments in Yugoslavia